The following tables present the ranks of the Lao People's Armed Forces, which, as a former French dominion, follow a rank system similar to those used by the French Armed Forces. The design closely follows the Soviet pattern, with two important exceptions: 1) senior officers have a broad coloured stripe instead of two narrow stripes used in the Soviet model; 2) stars are of equal size for all the ranks.

Officers

Pre-1983 general ranks

Enlisted

Pre-1983 enlisted ranks

References

External links
 Uniforminsignia.org (Lao People's Army)
 Uniforminsignia.org (Lao People's Liberation Army Air Force)
 Uniforminsignia.org (Lao Riverine Force)

Laos
Military of Laos